Frederick (Ferry) II of Lorraine-Vaudémont ( – 31 August 1470) was a French nobleman. He was Count of Vaudémont and Lord of Joinville from 1458 to 1470. He is sometimes numbered Frederick V by continuity with the Dukes of Lorraine.

Life 
Frederick was born c. 1428 as the son of Antoine of Lorraine, Count of Vaudémont and Lord of Joinville, and Marie of Harcourt, Countess of Harcourt and Aumale, as well as Baroness of Elbeuf.

In 1445, he married his cousin Yolande of Anjou (1428–1483), daughter of René I of Anjou, (King of Naples, Duke of Anjou, of Bar and of Lorraine, Count of Provence), and of Isabelle, Duchess of Lorraine. This marriage put an end to the litigation which existed between the fathers of the bride and groom, in connection with the succession of the Duchy of Lorraine. They had six children:

 Peter (died 1451)
 René II of Lorraine (1451–1508), Duke of Lorraine
 Nicholas, Lord of Joinville and Bauffremont (died about 1476)
 Joan (1458–01.25.1480), married Charles IV, Duke of Anjou in 1474
 Yolande, married William II, Landgrave of Hesse in 1497
 Margaret (1463–1521), married René of Alençon in 1488

In 1453 his father-in-law honoured him with the command of the troops that he sent to the Dauphin Louis to help him to fight the Duke of Savoy.

In 1456 René entrusted the government of the Duchy of Bar to Frederick, and in 1459 granted him the honorary title of Lieutenant-General of Sicily.

Frederick died in Joinville on August 31, 1470.

References

Sources

1420s births
1470 deaths
Year of birth uncertain
Counts of Vaudémont
House of Vaudémont